740 Naval Air Squadron (740 NAS) was a Naval Air Squadron of the Royal Navy's Fleet Air Arm. It was formed in 1943 as an Observer Training Squadron RNAS Arbroath (HMS Condor), disbanding the same year. From 1943 to 1945 it was a Communications Squadron based at RNAS Machrihanish (HMS Landrail).

History of 740 NAS

Observer Training School (1943)
740 Naval Air Squadron formed at RNAS Arbroath (HMS Condor) as an Observer Training Squadron, part of No.2 Observer Training School, on 4 May 1943, equipped with Supermarine Walrus, Vought OS2U Kingfisher and Fairey Swordfish aircraft. It lasted approximately three months, with the squadron disbanding, at RNAS Arbroath, on 5 August 1943.

Communications Squadron (1943 - 1945)
740 NAS reformed as a Communications Squadron operating out of RNAS Machrihanish (HMS Landrail), the squadron being one of its permanent residents between the 30 December 1943 and the 1 September 1945.

Aircraft flown

The squadron has flown a number of different aircraft types, including:
Supermarine Walrus
Vought Kingfisher I
Fairey Swordfish
de Havilland Dominie
Airspeed Oxford
Avro Anson
Beech Traveller Mk. I
Fairey Fulmar

Fleet Air Arm Bases 
740 NAS operated from a number of air bases:
Royal Naval Air Station ARBROATH (4 May 1943 - 5 August 1943)
Royal Naval Air Station MACHRIHANISH (30 December 1943 - 1 September 1945)

References

Citations

Bibliography

700 series Fleet Air Arm squadrons
Military units and formations established in 1943
Air squadrons of the Royal Navy in World War II